Ciara Considine is a musician known for her Celtic and folk music. She has toured throughout the world playing flute and piano, as well as other instruments, and singing.

Ciara Considine started singing with her older siblings, when she was a young child. Her parents were Irish immigrants living in the UK. She learned to play the flute and piano. Eventually, she joined the National Youth Choir of Great Britain. Later, she studied piano at the Royal Northern College of Music. She obtained a bachelor's degree, as well as a master's degree and a postgraduate diploma in music performance. Ciara also tutors instrumentalists.

Her music has been featured on the Irish and Celtic Music Podcast, hosted by Marc Gunn.

Ciara Considine has released two albums.

Albums
 Ó Mo Chroí (2008)
 Beyond The Waves (2010)

References

External links
 Ciara Considine home page
 Ciara Considine's Myspace Page
 Ciara Considine's CDBaby Page
 Ciara Considine on last.fm
 Ciara Considine at the iTunes Musc Store
 Ciara Considine on TourClare.com
 Ciara's profile on the Celtic Friends Network
 Review of Ciara's Album,  Ó Mo Chroí, from the Celtic MP3s Music Magazine.
 Review of Ciara's Song, Black is the Color, from the Celtic MP3s Music Magazine.

Living people
English folk musicians
Year of birth missing (living people)
English folk singers
People from Maidstone
Musicians from Kent